The Golden Eagle Award for Best Animated Feature Film (Russian: Золотой Орёл для лучший анимационный фильму) is one of twenty award categories presented annually by the National Academy of Motion Pictures Arts and Sciences of Russia. It is one of the Golden Eagle Awards, which were conceived by Nikita Mikhalkov as a counterweight to the Nika Award established in 1987 by the Russian Academy of Cinema Arts and Sciences.

Each year the members of the academy choose three (except in the year 2002) nominees to award the best animated film and the film as a perception. The first animator to be awarded was Alexey Demin for the film Cats Under Rain (Кошки под дождем). The most recent award was made to Dmitry Geller for Mistress of the Copper Mountain, an animation based on the tale of the eponymous character. The most successful animation director is Alexey Demin, Alexander Tatarsky, and Konstantin Bronzit with two wins each. Inna Evlannikova (who won one award), Anatoly Prokhorov, and Maria Muat (both have not won) were nominated thrice. Other people with multiple nominations include Elena Pitkevich (with two nominations but no wins) and Svetlana Andrianova (winning one from two nominations).

Nomineess and awardees
Key

References

External links
 

Original Score
Awards for best animated feature film
Lists of films by award